Uspen is a district of Pavlodar Region in northern Kazakhstan. The administrative center of the district is the selo of Uspenka. Many Kazakhstan Germans live in this area. Population:

Geography
Lake Bolshoy Azhbulat, a briny endorheic lake, is located in the district. The Burla river flows into the eastern lakeshore.

References

Districts of Kazakhstan
Pavlodar Region
Populated places established in 1935
1935 establishments in the Soviet Union